Deepika is an Indian given name. Deepika may also refer to:

 Deepika (newspaper), Malayalam newspaper.
 Deepika English Medium School, a Co-ed primary, middle and senior secondary English medium school.